Koliakode N. Krishnan Nair is an Indian politician and a lawyer. He represented Vamanapuram constituency in 6th, 7th, 8th, 9th and 13th Kerala Legislative Assembly.

Political life
He started political activities through student-youth movements. He worked with several farmers' organizations. Presently he is the member of the Senate of University of Kerala. He also serves as the member of governing committee of Pariyaram Co-operative Medical College. He was previously elected to Kerala legislature in 1980, 1982, 1987, 1991 and 2011. He was elected to Kerala University Senate. He was a senate member for 16 years. He was also a Syndicate member for 6 years. He served as the President of State Agriculture Co-Operative Bank and State Co-Operative Bank. Now he is the Chairman of the State Co-Operative Union.

Family
He is the son of Neelakanta Pillai and Lekshmikutty Amma. He has 2 brothers and a sister. He was born on 27 March 1938 at Koliyakode. He is a lawyer by profession. He is married to B Tulasi and has two sons, Unnikrishnan and Radhakrishnan. Lekshmi Nair, a culinary chef from Kerala is his niece.

References

Members of the Kerala Legislative Assembly
1938 births
Communist Party of India (Marxist) politicians from Kerala
Living people
People from Thiruvananthapuram district